Inclination is the angle between a reference plane and the orbital plane.

Inclination may also refer to:

Science
 Slope, tilt, steepness, or angle from horizontal of a line (in mathematics and geometry)
 Axial tilt, also known as equatorial inclination
 Grade (slope), the tilt of a topographic feature (hillside, etc.) or constructed element (road, etc.)
 Depression angle, part of a spherical coordinate system

Literature
 Inclination (ethics), an examination of desire in the context of moral worthiness 
 "Inclination" (novella), a science fiction novella by William Shunn